Dareville is an unincorporated community in Jefferson County, in the U.S. state of Illinois.

The community's name honors the local Dare family of settlers.

References

Unincorporated communities in Jefferson County, Illinois
Unincorporated communities in Illinois